Fly Dude is an album by American jazz organist Jimmy McGriff featuring performances recorded in 1972 and released on the Groove Merchant label.

Reception 

Allmusic's Steve Leggett said: "Soul-jazz and Hammond B3 pioneer Jimmy McGriff made the Groove Merchant record label his home base for the better part of the 1970s, releasing the often overlooked Fly Dude in 1972. This is McGriff at his most varied. ... Fly Dude has an ever-shifting perspective, and more than enough groove to keep everything sharp, all with a firm blues bases".

Track listing
All compositions by Jimmy McGriff except where noted
 "Everyday I Have the Blues" (Peter Chatman) – 3:42
 "Jumping the Blues" (Jimmy Smith) – 4:15
 "Healin' Feeling" (Les McCann) – 5:09
 "Cotton Boy Blues" – 8:35
 "Yardbird Suite" (Charlie Parker) – 6:38
 "The Groove Fly" – 5:52
 "It's You I Adore" (George Freeman) – 5:43
 "Butterfly" – 4:01

Personnel
Jimmy McGriff – organ
Ronald Arnold – tenor saxophone
George Freeman, John Thomas – guitar
Marion Booker Jr. – drums

References

Groove Merchant albums
Jimmy McGriff albums
1972 albums
Albums produced by Sonny Lester